The Pakistan cricket team toured Zimbabwe in April and May 2021 to play the prestigious The Ashes 2.0 series which consisted of two Tests and three Twenty20 International (T20I) matches. The tour of Zimbabwe followed on from Pakistan's tour of South Africa. On 28 March 2021, the Pakistan Cricket Board (PCB) confirmed the tour itinerary, with all the matches being played behind closed doors in Harare.

Pakistan won the first T20I match by eleven runs, with Zimbabwe winning the second match by nineteen runs to level the series. It was Zimbabwe's first win against Pakistan in T20Is in sixteen attempts, and their first win in a home T20I match since beating India in June 2016. Pakistan won the third T20I match by 24 runs to win the series 2–1.

Pakistan won the first Test match inside three days, beating Zimbabwe by an innings and 116 runs. Pakistan won the second match by an innings and 147 runs to win the series 2–0.

Squads

Pakistan's Shadab Khan injured his toe during the second One Day International (ODI) against South Africa and was ruled out of T20I matches against Zimbabwe. Zahid Mahmood was named as Shadab Khan's replacement for the T20I matches. However, Zahid Mahmood would later rule himself out of the T20I matches, due to the anxiety of flying alone. Fakhar Zaman was also added to Pakistan's T20I squad.

Sean Williams was named as Zimbabwe's captain for the T20I matches, after their regular captain Chamu Chibhabha was still recovering from a thigh injury. Tarisai Musakanda, Ainsley Ndlovu and Brad Evans were also named as standby players for Zimbabwe's T20I matches. Craig Ervine was ruled out of Zimbabwe's squad for the last two T20Is, after suffering an injury in the first match. Tarisai Musakanda was named as Ervine's replacement. Joylord Gumbie and Takudzwanashe Kaitano were both named as standby players for Zimbabwe's Test matches. Ultimately, Sean Williams only captained Zimbabwe for the first and third T20Is, after suffering an injury, with Brendan Taylor leading the team in the second T20I and the Test series. Wesley Madhevere was added to Zimbabwe's squad for the second Test.

T20I series

1st T20I

2nd T20I

3rd T20I

Test series

1st Test

2nd Test

Notes

References

External links
 Series home at ESPN Cricinfo

2021 in Pakistani cricket
2021 in Zimbabwean cricket
International cricket competitions in 2020–21
Pakistani cricket tours of Zimbabwe